= Palazzo Borghese (mountain) =

Mountain in Italy

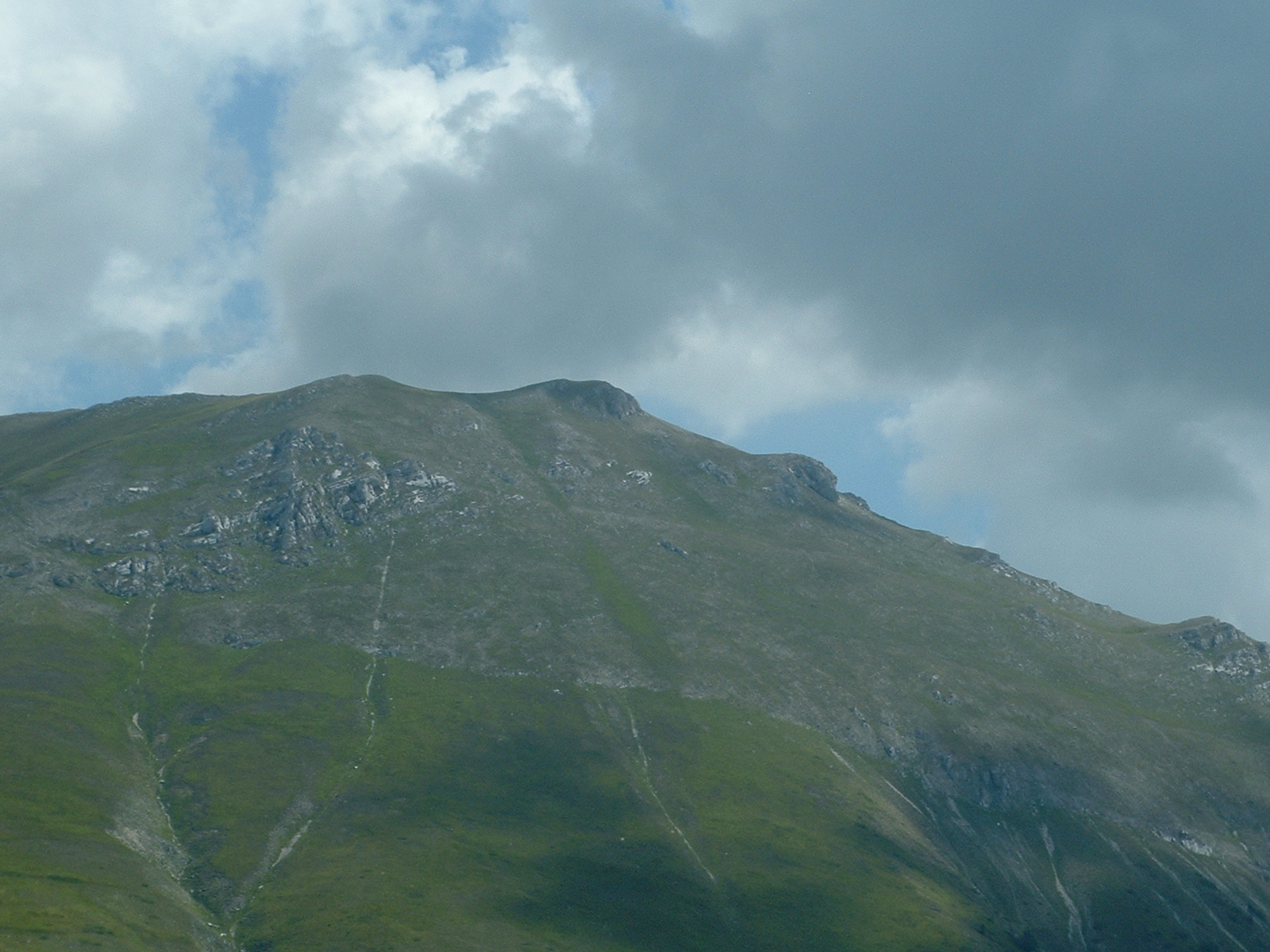

Highest point
- Elevation: 2,145 m (7,037 ft)
- Prominence: 65 m (213 ft)
- Coordinates: 42°52′09″N 13°14′10″E

Geography
- Location within Italy
- Location: Marche, Italy
- Parent range: Apennines

Palazzo Borghese is a mountain of Marche, Italy.
